State Highway 131 (SH 131) is a Texas state highway that runs from  US 277 near Eagle Pass to  US 90 in Brackettville.

Route description
SH 131 begins at  US 277, 12 miles north of Eagle Pass near Maverick County Memorial International Airport. The route travels roughly to the north-northeast through unincorporated sections of Maverick and Kinney counties; the only incorporated community between the route's termini is the city of Spofford. The highway ends in Brackettville at a junction with  US 90.

History
SH 131 was originally designated on January 18, 1928 from Brackettville to Spofford. The extension south was added on January 18, 1935. On July 15, 1935, the extension south of Spofford was cancelled. The extension south of Spofford was restored on November 24, 1936.

Major intersections

References

131
Transportation in Kinney County, Texas
Transportation in Maverick County, Texas